Zan (昝) is a Chinese surname. It is romanized Tsan in Wade–Giles, or Zaan in Cantonese romanization. According to a 2013 study, it was the 391st most common name in China; it was shared by 87,000 people, or 0.007% of the population, with the province with the most people being Sichuan. It is the 165th name on the Hundred Family Surnames poem.

Origins
a surname originating in ancient southwestern China
adopted as a surname by the Zan Lu (昝盧) or Chi Lu (叱盧) families from the Xianbei people in northern China during the Northern Wei period (AD 386–534)
said to be adopted in place of the surname Jiu ( meaning ‘disaster’)

Notable people
Zan Jian (昝堅), Jin-era general
Zan Jiaxiang (昝家驤), basketball player and coach

References

Individual Chinese surnames